When Goodbye Means Forever... is the debut studio album by Australian metalcore band, I Killed the Prom Queen, which was released in 2003 by Resist Records. The US version was released in March 2004 by Eulogy Recordings.

Track listing

Personnel
I Killed the Prom Queen members
 Michael Crafter – vocals
 Jona Weinhofen – guitar, vocals
 Kevin Cameron – guitar
 Sean Kennedy – bass guitar
 J. J. Peters – drums

Production details
 Dan Jones – producer

Charts

References

External links 
 

2003 debut albums
I Killed the Prom Queen albums
Resist Records albums